Solid State Physics, better known by its colloquial name Ashcroft and Mermin, is an introductory condensed matter physics textbook written by Neil Ashcroft and N. David Mermin. Published in 1976 by Saunders College Publishing and designed by Scott Olelius, the book has been translated into over half a dozen languages and it and its competitor, Introduction to Solid State Physics (often shortened to Kittel), are considered the standard introductory textbooks of condensed matter physics.

Content 

 The Drude Theory of Metals
 The Sommerfeld Theory of Metals
 Failures of the Free Electron Model
 Crystal Lattices
 The Reciprocal lattice
 Determination of Crystal Structures by X-Ray Diffraction
 Classification of Bravais Lattices and Crystal Structures
 Electron Levels in a Periodic Potential: General Properties
 Electrons in a Weak Periodic Potential
 The Tight-Binding Method
 Other Methods for Calculating Band Structure
 The Semiclassical Model of Electron Dynamics
 The Semiclassical Theory of Conduction in Metals
 Measuring the Fermi Surface
 Band Structure of Selected Metals
 Beyond the Relaxation-Time Approximation
 Beyond the Independent Electron Approximation
 Surface Effects
 Classification of Solids
 Cohesive Energy
 Failures of the Static Lattice Model
 Classical Theory of the Harmonic Crystal
 Quantum Theory of the Harmonic Crystal
 Measuring Phonon Dispersion Relations
 Anharmonic Effects in Crystals
 Phonons in Metals
 Dielectric Properties of Insulators
 Homogeneous Semiconductors
 Inhomogeneous Semiconductors
 Defects in Crystals
 Diamagnetism and Paramagnetism
 Electron Interactions and Magnetic Structure
 Magnetic Ordering
 Superconductivity

Reception 
The book has been reviewed several times and has been recommended in many other works. In a review of another work by the MRS Bulletin in 2011, the book was said to be "the indispensable work on electronic systems for experimental condensed matter physicists", due largely to the book's "lucidity and panache". The book is also recommended in other textbooks on condensed matter physics, including The Solid State by Harold Max Rosenberg in 1979, where it is called a "detailed, higher-level, modern treatment." The textbook Solid-State Physics for Electronics by Andre Moliton states in the foreword that the book aims to prepare students to "use by him- or herself the classic works of taught solid state physics, for example, those of Kittel and Ashcroft and Mermin." Along with Kittel, the textbook Introduction to Solid State Physics and Crystalline Nanostructures by Giuseppe Iadonisi, Giovanni Cantele, and Maria Luisa Chiofalo included the book in the "Acknowledgements" section as "special mentions". It is also called one of the standard textbooks of solid state physics in the textbook Polarized Electrons In Surface Physics. In a 2003 article detailing Mermin's contributions to solid state physics, the book was said to be "an extraordinarily readable textbook of the subject, which introduced a whole generation of solid state specialists to a subtle and elegant way of doing theoretical physics." The book, along with Kittel is also used as a benchmark for other books on solid-state physics; the publisher's description for the book Advanced Solid State Physics by Philip Phillips that was supplied to the Library of Congress for its bibliography entry states: "This is a modern book in solid state physics that should be accessible to anyone who has a working level of solid state physics at the Kittel or Ashcroft/Mermin level."

Reviews 
The book received several reviews, including published articles in Science, Physics Today, and Physics Bulletin in 1977. It was also reviewed in German.

Impressionism, Realism, and the aging of Ashcroft and Mermin 
In July 2013, José Menéndez, a physics professor at the Arizona State University Tempe campus published an article titled "Impressionism, Realism, and the aging of Ashcroft and Mermin" in Physics Today that stated: "It is undoubtedly one of the best physics books ever written, but it is not aging well". Both Ashcroft and Mermin wrote separate responses that were published in the same issue, addressing Menéndez's concerns. In his reply, Ashcroft wrote: "Over the years many readers have remarked that the initial edition of our book should 'not be touched'; it is just right in its treatments of the fundamentals." He then went on to say that writing a sequel "encompassing the many advances in condensed-matter physics that have occurred over the past 38 years" could be an option, but pointed to the fact that the book was translated into French, German, and Portuguese in the previous ten years as evidence that others agree it should be left as is.

Release details

References

External links 
 
 
 

1976 non-fiction books
Physics textbooks
Condensed matter physics
Harcourt (publisher) books
Henry Holt and Company books